Bolshoye Zakhonye is a village in Plyussky District of Pskov Oblast, Russia.

Rural localities in Pskov Oblast